The Madrean alligator lizard (Elgaria kingii) is a species of lizard in the family Anguidae. The species is endemic to the southwestern United States and adjacent northwestern Mexico.

Etymology
The specific name, kingii, is in honor of Phillip Parker King, an Australian-born Royal Navy officer who surveyed the coast of South America.

Geographic range
Elgaria kingii is found from southeastern Arizona and southwestern New Mexico, United States, southward to Jalisco, Colima, Nayarit, southeastern Zacatecas, and southwestern Aguascalientes, Mexico.

Subspecies
Three subspecies are recognized as being valid, including the nominotypical subspecies.
Elgaria kingii ferruginea 
Elgaria kingii kingii 
Elgaria kingii nobilis 

Nota bene: A trinomial authority in parentheses indicates that the subspecies was originally described in a genus other than Elgaria.

References

Further reading
Baird SF, Girard C (1852). "Characteristics of some New Reptiles in the Museum of the Smithsonian Institution". Proc. Acad. Nat. Sci. Philadelphia 6: 125-129. (Elgaria nobilis, new species, p. 129).
Boulenger GA (1885). Catalogue of the Lizards in the British Museum (Natural History). Second Edition. Volume II. ... Anguidæ ... London: Trustees of the British Museum (Natural History). (Taylor and Francis, printers). xiii + 497 pp. + Plates I-XXIV. (Gerrhonotus kingii, pp. 274–275).
Gray JE (1838). Catalogue of the Slender-tongued Saurians, with Descriptions of many new Genera and Species. Ann. Mag. Nat. Hist., First Series 1: 274-283, 388-394. (Elgaria kingii, new species, pp. 390–391).
Smith HM, Brodie ED Jr (1982). Reptiles of North America: A Guide to Field Identification. New York: Golden Press. 240 pp. . ("Elgaria kingi [sic]", pp. 86–87).
Stebbins RC (2003). A Field Guide to Western Reptiles and Amphibians, Third Edition. The Peterson Field Guide Series ®. Boston and New York: Houghton Mifflin. xiii + 533 pp. . (Elgaria kingii, pp. 334–335 + Plate 41 + Map 124).
Webb RG (1962). "A New Alligator Lizard (Genus Gerrhonotus) from Western México". Herpetologica 18 (2): 73-79. (Gerrhonotus kingi [sic] ferrugineus, new subspecies).

Elgaria
Reptiles of Honduras
Reptiles described in 1838
Taxa named by John Edward Gray